Ispanaklı yumurta (Turkish: Ispanaklı yumurta), Ottoman and Turkish Jews (Kon espinaka)  is a Turkish dish made with eggs, fried onion and spinach. Its recipe is given in the Ottoman Cookbook Aşçıbaşı written by Mahmud Nedim Bin Tosun.

See also 
 Nargesi Kebab
 Mirza-Qasemi
 Baghali ghatogh
 Scrambled eggs
 Omelette

References  

Turkish cuisine
Egg dishes
Omelettes